"Dans la place pour être" is a song by French hip hop duo Casseurs Flowters and produced by Skread. It is the 9th track from their debut studio album, Orelsan et Gringe sont les Casseurs Flowters, where its title is "20h08 – Dans la place pour être". Despite not being officially released as a single, the song entered the French Singles Chart at number 34 on 23 November 2013, and has since peaked at that same position.

Track listing
 Digital download
 "20h08 – Dans la place pour être" – 3:25

Chart performance

References

2013 songs
Orelsan songs
Casseurs Flowters songs
French hip hop songs
Songs written by Gringe
Songs written by Orelsan
Song recordings produced by Skread